Cutler is a surname meaning "maker of cutlery", and may refer to:

Business
 A. Cutler & Son, American furniture manufacturer known for roll-top desks
 Alexander M. Cutler, American businessman
 Angus Knowles-Cutler, British businessman and politician
 George E. Cutler, American businessman
 James Goold Cutler (1848–1927), mail chute inventor and mayor of Rochester, NY
 May Cutler, Canadian founder of Tundra Books and the first female Mayor of Westmount, Quebec
 Otis H. Cutler (1866–1922), American businessman and politician

Engineering, science, mathematics and medicine
 Adele Cutler, English-born New Zealand and American statistician
 C. Chapin Cutler, United States electrical engineer
 Charles R. Cutler, United States industrial engineer
 Dave Cutler, software engineer
 Elliott Cutler, American surgeon and medical educator
 Hugh Carson Cutler (1912–1998), American botanist
 John Charles Cutler, surgeon, manager in United States Public Health Service
 Leonard Cutler, authority on ultra-precise timekeeping devices and standards
 Sean Cutler, professor of biology and chemistry

Law, politics, and diplomacy
 Arthur Roden Cutler, Australian diplomat and war hero
 Augustus W. Cutler, United States politician and lawyer
 Bruce Cutler, United States criminal defense lawyer
 Bryan Cutler, Pennsylvania politician
 Charles Cutler, Australian politician
 Elisha Cutler Jr., American politician
 Elliot Cutler, American lawyer
 Ephraim Cutler, United States politician
 Horace Cutler, British politician
 John Christopher Cutler, second governor of the U.S. state of Utah
 Lloyd Cutler, attorney
 Nathan Cutler, United States politician
 Reed F. Cutler, United States politician
 Robert Barry Cutler, Canadian politician
 Robert M. Cutler, Nova Scotia merchant and politician
 Sir Roden Cutler, an Australian diplomat
 Robert Cutler, U.S. administrator
 Stephen M. Cutler, American lawyer
 Thomas Cutler (Canadian politician), Nova Scotia lawyer and politician
 Walter L. Cutler, American diplomat
 William P. Cutler, United States politician

Music
 Adge Cutler, British musician 
 Chris Cutler, English musician
 Eric Cutler, United States musician
 Joe Cutler, British composer
 Jon Cutler, United States house DJ
 Mark Cutler, United States singer/songwriter
 Miriam Cutler, American composer
 Sam Cutler,  former tour manager for The Rolling Stones
 Scott Cutler, songwriter and musician

Visual and performing arts
 Kate Cutler, English singer and actress
 Katherine Cutler, American architect
 Matthew Cutler, English dancer
 Nicole Cutler, British ballroom dancer

Religion
 Alpheus Cutler, Latter Day Saint leader
 Jerome Cutler, rabbi
 Manasseh Cutler, American clergyman
 Timothy Cutler, United States Episcopal clergyman

Sports
 Arthur Cutler (cricketer), New Zealand cricketer
 Bill Cutler (baseball executive), American baseball executive
 Robert B. Cutler, American Olympic rower and conspiracy theorist
 Dave Cutler (Canadian football), Canadian football player
 Eric Cutler (footballer), English footballer
 Jay Cutler (American football), quarterback
 Jay Cutler (bodybuilder)
 Kenny Cutler, United States soccer player
 Lester Cutler, American sprint canoer
 Marcus Cutler, American football coach
 Neil Cutler, English footballer
 Paul Cutler, English footballer
 Stan Cutler, Australian former professional rugby league footballer 
 Steve Cutler, Australian rugby player
 Tim Cutler, Australian cricketer
 Tom Cutler (born 1995), Australian rules footballer
 Trent Cutler, Australian rugby league player
 Wes Cutler, Canadian football player

Writers
 Ivor Cutler, Scottish poet
 Jane Cutler, American writer
 Jessica Cutler, journalist
 Judith Cutler, British writer
 Lizzie Petit Cutler, American writer

Other
 Allan Cutler, Canadian sponsorship scandal whistleblower
 Casey Cutler, United States criminal
 Craig Cutler, American photographer
 David Cutler, economist
 Hannah Tracy Cutler, abolitionist, temperance and women's suffrage activist
 Helen Cutler, Australian charity worker and patron
 John Cutler (disambiguation), several people
 Lysander Cutler, Union Army general
 R. J. Cutler, United States television- and film-maker
 Wolfgang Cutler, a fictional character on the television show Oz

Occupational surnames
Jewish surnames
English-language occupational surnames